Karpovsky is a rural locality (a settlement) and the administrative center of Novokarpovsky Selsoviet, Tyumentsevsky District, Altai Krai, Russia. The population was 387 as of 2013. It was founded in 1914. There are 7 streets.

Geography 
Karpovsky is located 21 km southeast of Tyumentsevo (the district's administrative centre) by road. Voznesensky is the nearest rural locality.

References 

Rural localities in Tyumentsevsky District